The 1989 Washington State Cougars football team was an American football team that represented Washington State University in the Pacific-10 Conference (Pac-10) during the 1989 NCAA Division I-A football season. In their first season under head coach Mike Price, the Cougars compiled a 6–5 record (3–5 in Pac-10, tied for seventh), and outscored their opponents 351 to 268.

The team's statistical leaders included Aaron Garcia with 2,741 passing yards, Steve Broussard with 1,237 rushing yards, and Tim Stallworth with 548 receiving yards. The Cougars won their first four games, then were 6–1 and ranked fifteenth in the AP poll, but lost their final four games.

Following the departure of head coach Dennis Erickson for Miami in early March, Price was hired a week later; a former Cougar player and assistant, he was previously the head coach for eight years in the Big Sky Conference at Weber State in Ogden, Utah.

Schedule

Roster

NFL Draft
Six Cougars were selected in the 1990 NFL Draft.

References

Washington State
Washington State Cougars football seasons
Washington State Cougars football